Morphacris fasciata is a species of band-winged grasshopper in the family Acrididae. It is found in Africa, Europe, and Asia.

References

External links

 

Oedipodinae
Orthoptera of Africa
Orthoptera of Asia
Orthoptera of Europe
Insects described in 1815